Grand Duke Nicholas Nikolaevich of Russia (Russian: Николай Николаевич Романов (младший – the younger); 18 November 1856 – 5 January 1929) was a Russian general in World War I (1914–1918). The son of Grand Duke Nicholas Nikolaevich of Russia (1831–1891), and a grandson of Emperor Nicholas I of Russia, he was commander in chief of the Imperial Russian Army units on the main front in the first year of the war, during the reign of his first cousin once removed, Nicholas II. Although held in high regard by Paul von Hindenburg, he struggled with the colossal task of leading Russia's war effort against Germany, including strategy, tactics, logistics and coordination with the government. After the Gorlice–Tarnów offensive in 1915, Tsar Nicholas replaced the Grand Duke as commander-in-chief of the army. He later was a successful commander-in-chief in the Caucasus region. He was briefly recognized as the Emperor in 1922 in areas controlled by the White Armies movement in the Russian Far East.

Biography

Family
A very tall man (1.98m / 6' 6"), Nicholas, named after his paternal grandfather, the emperor, was born as the eldest son to Grand Duke Nicholas Nicolaevich of Russia (1831–1891) and Alexandra Petrovna of Oldenburg (1838–1900) on 18 November 1856. His father was the sixth child and third son born to Nicholas I of Russia and his Empress consort Alexandra Fedorovna of Prussia (1798–1860). Alexandra Fedorovna was a daughter of Frederick William III of Prussia and Louise of Mecklenburg-Strelitz.

Nicholas's mother, his father's first cousin's daughter, was a daughter of Duke Konstantin Peter of Oldenburg (1812–1881) and Princess Therese of Nassau (1815–1871). His maternal grandfather was a son of Duke George of Oldenburg and Grand Duchess Catherine Pavlovna of Russia, daughter of Paul I of Russia and Maria Fedorovna of Württemberg. (Catherine was later remarried to William I of Württemberg.) His maternal grandmother was a daughter of Wilhelm, Duke of Nassau (1792–1839) and Princess Luise of Saxe-Hildburghausen. The Duke of Nassau was a son of Friedrich Wilhelm, Duke of Nassau (1768–1816) and Burgravine Louise Isabelle of Kirchberg. His paternal grandparents were Duke Karl Christian of Nassau-Weilburg (1735–1788) and Carolina of Orange-Nassau. Carolina was a daughter of William IV of Orange and Anne, Princess Royal and Princess of Orange. Anne was the eldest daughter of George II of Great Britain and Caroline of Ansbach.

Grand Duke Nicholas was the first cousin once removed of Tsar Nicholas II. To distinguish between them, the Grand Duke was often known within the Imperial family as "Nikolasha": the Grand Duke was also known as "Nicholas the Tall" while the Tsar was "Nicholas the Short".

Early military career

Grand Duke Nicholas was educated at the school of military engineers and received his commission in 1873. During the Russo-Turkish War (1877–1878), he was on the staff of his father who was commander in chief. He distinguished himself on two occasions in this war. He worked his way up through all the ranks until he was appointed commander of the Guard Hussar Regiment in 1884.

He had a reputation as a tough commander, yet one respected by his troops. His experience was more as a trainer of soldiers than a leader in battle. Nicholas was a very religious man, praying in the morning and at night as well as before and after meals. He was happiest in the country, hunting or caring for his estates.

By 1895, he was inspector-general of the cavalry, a post he held for 10 years. His tenure has been judged a success with reforms in training, cavalry schools, cavalry reserves and the remount services. He was not given an active command during the Russo-Japanese War, perhaps because the Tsar did not wish to hazard the prestige of the Romanovs and because he wanted a loyal general in command at home in case of domestic disturbances. Thus, Nicholas did not have the opportunity to gain experience in battlefield command.

Grand Duke Nicholas played a crucial role during the Revolution of 1905. With disorder spreading and the future of the dynasty at stake, the Tsar had a choice of instituting the reforms suggested by Count Sergei Witte or imposing a military dictatorship. The only man with the prestige to keep the allegiance of the army in such a coup was the Grand Duke. The Tsar asked him to assume the role of a military dictator. In an emotional scene at the palace, Nicholas refused, drew his pistol and threatened to shoot himself on the spot if the Tsar did not endorse Witte's plan. This act was decisive in forcing Nicholas II to agree to the reforms.

From 1905 to the outbreak of World War I, he was commander-in-chief of the Petersburg Military District. He had the reputation there of appointing men of humble origins to positions of authority. The lessons of the Russo-Japanese War were drilled into his men.

Marriage

On 29 April 1907, Nicholas married Princess Anastasia of Montenegro (1869–1935), the daughter of King Nicholas I, and sister of Princess Milica, who had married Nicholas's brother, Grand Duke Peter. They had no children. She had previously been married to George Maximilianovich, 6th Duke of Leuchtenberg, by whom she had two children, until their divorce in 1906. Since the Montenegrins were a fiercely Slavic, anti-Ottoman people from the Balkans, Anastasia reinforced the Pan-Slavic tendencies of Nicholas.

Hunting

Nicholas was a hunter. Ownership of borzoi hounds was restricted to members of the highest nobility, and Nicholas's packs were well-known. After the revolution, the dogs in his kennel were sold off by the new Soviet government. In his lifetime, Nicholas and his dogs caught hundreds of wolves. A pair of borzoi were used, which caught the wolf, one on each side, while Nicholas dismounted and cut the wolf's throat with a knife. Hunting was his major recreation, and he traveled in his private train across Russia with his horses and dogs, hunting while on his rounds of inspection.

World War I

Eastern Front

The Grand Duke had no part in the planning and preparations for World War I, that being the responsibility of General Vladimir Sukhomlinov and the general staff. On the eve of the outbreak of World War I, his first cousin once removed, the Emperor Nicholas II of Russia, yielded to the entreaties of his ministers and appointed Grand Duke Nicholas to the supreme command. He was 57 years old and had never commanded armies in the field before, although he had spent almost all of his life on active service. His appointment was popular in the army. He was given responsibility for the largest army ever put into the field up to that date. He recalled that "... on receipt of the Imperial order, he spent much of his time crying because he did not know how to approach his new duties."

On 14 August 1914, he published the Manifesto to the Polish Nation.

Grand Duke Nicholas was responsible for all Russian forces fighting against Germany, Austria-Hungary, and Turkey. He decided that their major effort must be in Poland, which thrust toward Germany like a salient, flanked by German East Prussia in the north, and Austro-Hungarian Galicia in the south.  He planned to attend first to the flanks and when they were secure to invade German Silesia. In the north poor coordination of the two invading Russian armies resulted in the disaster of Tannenberg. In the south they conquered much of Galicia.  Their subsequent move toward Silesia was blocked by the  Battle of the Vistula River and Battle of Łódź. The Grand Duke picked and chose from the various plans offered by his generals. The Grand Duke begged for the artillery and ammunition they desperately lacked, so he  could not embark on a coherent plan for victory. Nicholas came to power because of his royal status, and the tsar's belief that God was guiding his decision. He lacked the broad strategic sense and the ruthless drive to command all the Russian armies. His headquarters had a curiously calm atmosphere, despite the many defeats and the millions of casualties. He failed in terms of strategy and tactics, as well as logistics, selection of generals, maintaining morale, and gaining support from the government. On a personal level he was well liked by both officers and men.

After the Great Retreat of the Russian army, the Chief of the General Staff Nikolai Yanushkevich, with the full support of the Grand Duke Nicholas, ordered the army to devastate the border territories and expel the "enemy" nations within. The Russian authorities launched pogroms against German populations in Russian cities, massacred Jews in their towns and villages and deported 500,000 Jews and 250,000 Germans into the Russian interior. On 11 June 1915, a pogrom began against Germans in Petrograd, with over 500 factories, stores and offices looted and mob violence unleashed against Germans. The Russian military leadership regarded Muslims, Germans and Poles as traitors and spies, while Jews were considered political unreliables.

As a result of his failure, the Tsar removed the Grand Duke as commander of the Russian armed forces on 21 August 1915 and took personal command.

The Caucasus
Upon his dismissal, the Grand Duke was immediately appointed commander-in-chief and viceroy in the Caucasus (replacing Count Illarion Vorontsov-Dashkov). While the Grand Duke was officially in command, General Yudenich was the driving figure in the Russian Caucasus army, so the Grand Duke focused on the civil administration. Their opponent was the Ottoman Empire. While the Grand Duke was in command, the Russian army sent an expeditionary force through to Persia (now Iran) to link up with British troops. Also in 1916, the Russian army captured the fortress town of Erzerum, the port of Trebizond (now Trabzon) and the town of Erzincan. The Turks responded with an offensive of their own. Fighting around Lake Van swung back and forth, but ultimately proved inconclusive.

It is reported that, while visiting the garrison of Kostroma he met Said Nursi, a famous Muslim cleric who was a prisoner of war. Because of Nursi's disrespectful attitude (he refused to greet the Grand Duke first saying that faithful's are more senior than infidels), Grand Duke gave an order to execute him. But after seeing Nursi's devotion to his religion during his last prayer, Grand Duke changed his mind and amnestied Nursi.  Nothing in the Grand Duke's record  suggests that he would have even considered  such a war crime. At the time he was urging the Tsar to set up colleges for training Muslim clerics so they would not have to study  abroad.

Nicholas tried to have a railway built from Russian Georgia to the conquered territories with a view to bringing up more supplies for a new offensive in 1917. But, in March 1917, the Tsar was overthrown and the Russian army began slowly to fall apart.

Revolution 
The February Revolution found Nicholas in the Caucasus. He was appointed by the Emperor, in his last official act, as the supreme commander in chief, and was wildly received as he journeyed to headquarters in Mogilev; however, within 24 hours of his arrival, the new prime minister, Prince Georgy Lvov, cancelled his appointment. Nicholas spent the next two years in Crimea, sometimes under house arrest, taking little part in politics. There appears to have been some sentiment to have him head the White Army forces active in southern Russia at the time, but the leaders in charge, especially General Anton Denikin, were afraid that a strong monarchist figurehead would alienate the more left leaning constituents of the movement. He and his wife escaped just ahead of the Red Army in April 1919, aboard the British Royal Navy battleship HMS Marlborough.

On 8 August 1922, Nicholas was proclaimed as the emperor of all the Russias by the Zemsky Sobor of the Priamurye region in the Far East by White Army general Mikhail Diterikhs. Nicholas was already living abroad and consequently was not present. Two months later the Priamurye region fell to the Bolsheviks.

In exile 
After a stay in Genoa as a guest of his brother-in-law, Victor Emmanuel III, King of Italy, Nicholas and his wife took up residence in a small chateau at Choigny, 20 miles outside of Paris. He was under the protection of the French secret police as well as by a small number of faithful Cossack retainers.

He became the symbolic figurehead of an anti-Soviet Russian monarchist movement, after assuming on 16 November 1924 the supreme command of all Russian forces in exile and thus of the Russian All-Military Union, which had been founded in the Kingdom of Serbs, Croats and Slovenes by Gen Pyotr Wrangel two months prior. The monarchists made plans to send agents into Russia. Conversely a top priority of the Soviet secret police was to penetrate this monarchist organization and to kidnap Nicholas. They were successful in the former, infiltrating the group with spies. (OGPU later lured the anti-Bolshevik British master spy Sidney Reilly back to the Soviet Union (1925) where he was killed.) They did not succeed however, in kidnapping Nicholas. As late as June 1927, the monarchists were able to set off a bomb at the Lubyanka Prison in Moscow.

Grand Duke Nicholas died on 5 January 1929 of natural causes on the French Riviera, where he had gone to escape the rigors of winter. He was originally buried in the church of St. Michael the Archangel Church in Cannes, France. In 2014 Nicholas Romanov, Prince of Russia (1922–2014) and Prince Dimitri Romanov (1926-2016) requested the transfer of his remains. The bodies of Nicholas Nikolaevich and his wife were re-buried in Moscow at the World War I memorial military cemetery in May 2015.

Honours and awards
The Grand Duke received several Russian and foreign decorations:
Russian
  Knight 4th Class of the Order of St. George - 1877
  Knight 3rd Class of the Order of St. George - 1914
  Knight 2nd Class of the Order of St. George - 1915
  Knight of the Order of St. Andrew the Apostle the First-called - 1856
  Knight of the Order of Saint Alexander Nevsky - 1856
  Knight 1st Class of the Order of St. Anna - 1856
  Knight 1st Class of the Order of St. Stanislaus - 1856
  Knight of the Imperial Order of the White Eagle - 1856
  Knight 1st Class of the Imperial Order of Saint Prince Vladimir - 1896

Foreign
  Knight of the Order of the Most Holy Annunciation (Kingdom of Italy) - 18 June 1890 - during a visit to Russia of King Victor Emmanuel III
  Knight of the Order of the Elephant (Denmark) -  19 July 1909
  Grand Cross of the Order of the Redeemer (Kingdom of Greece)
  Grand Cross of the Ludwig Order (Grand Duchy of Hesse and by Rhine) - 10 March 1886
  Grand Cross of the House Order of the Wendish Crown (Mecklenburg)
  Grand Cross of the Order of Danilo I (Principality of Montenegro)
  Grand Cross of the House and Merit Order of Peter Frederick Louis, with Golden Crown (Grand Duchy of Oldenburg) - 7 December 1856
  Knight of the Order of the Black Eagle (Kingdom of Prussia) - 23 March 1877
  Pour le Mérite (military) (Kingdom of Prussia) - 22 March 1879
  Grand Cross of the Order of the Cross of Takovo (Kingdom of Serbia)
  Grand Cross of the Order of the Star of Romania (Kingdom of Romania)
  Grand Cross of the Royal Hungarian Order of St. Stephen (Austria-Hungary) - 1896
  Grand Cross of the Legion d'Honneur (France) - January 1897
  Grand Cross of the Order of the Württemberg Crown (Kingdom of Württemberg) - 1882

Ancestry

In popular culture
Grand Duke Nicholas was portrayed in the 1971 film Nicholas and Alexandra by Harry Andrews, and in the 1974 television drama Fall of Eagles by John Phillips .

References

Sources
 
 Robinson, Paul. "A Study of Grand Duke Nikolai Nikolaevich as Supreme Commander of the Russian Army, 1914–1915," Historian (Fall 2013) 75#3 pp 475–498 online
Fromkin, David. A Peace To End All Peace Avon Books, New York, 1990
John Curtis Perry and Constantine Pleshakov. The Flight of the Romanovs, A Family Saga Basic Books, New York, 1999
"Encyclopædia Britannica", Vol. 16, pp. 420–421, Chicago, 1958
Figes, Orlando. A People's Tragedy, The Russian Revolution 1891–1924, Pilmico, London, 1997
 Robinson, Paul. "A Study of Grand Duke Nikolai Nikolaevich as Supreme Commander of the Russian Army, 1914–1915." Historian 75.3 (2013): 475–498. online</ref>

External links 

 
 

1856 births
1929 deaths
Royalty from Saint Petersburg
People from Sankt-Peterburgsky Uyezd
Commanders-in-chief of the Russian Army
House of Holstein-Gottorp-Romanov
Russian grand dukes
Military Engineering-Technical University alumni
Russian military personnel of World War I
Russian military leaders
Emigrants from the Russian Empire to Italy
Recipients of the Order of St. George of the Second Degree
Recipients of the Order of St. George of the Third Degree
Grand Croix of the Légion d'honneur
Grand Crosses of the Order of Saint Stephen of Hungary
Recipients of the Order of the Cross of Takovo
19th-century people from the Russian Empire
Emigrants from the Russian Empire to France
Russian anti-communists
Russian monarchists
Pretenders to the Russian throne
Burials at Bratsky Cemetery, Moscow
World War I crimes by the Russian Empire
Military personnel from Saint Petersburg